Robert Carleton Smith (b. 19 Feb 1908; d. 28 May 1984 Centre Island, New York) was the director of the National Arts Foundation and organized the International Awards Foundation to establish awards in fields not covered by the Nobel Prize.

Smith was instrumental in establishing the Pritzker Architecture Prize and the J. Paul Getty Award for Conservation Leadership.
Smith taught music appreciation at the University of Illinois from 1926 to 1929, economics and foreign trade at De Paul University from 1928 to 1934, and music history at Oxford University from 1931 to 1939. He was the music editor of Esquire and was European correspondent for the New York Herald Tribune. During the late 1940s he helped recover music manuscripts that had gone missing during the war.

External links 
  The Smith, C. mss., 1929-1978, Lilly Library Manuscript Collections,  Indiana University at Bloomington

References 

University of Chicago alumni
University of Illinois alumni
DePaul University faculty
American music journalists
1908 births
1984 deaths
New York Herald Tribune people
People from Centre Island, New York
20th-century American non-fiction writers